Faust is the protagonist of a classic German legend based on the historical Johann Georg Faust ( 1480–1540).

The erudite Faust is highly successful yet dissatisfied with his life, which leads him to make a pact with the Devil at a crossroads, exchanging his soul for unlimited knowledge and worldly pleasures. The Faust legend has been the basis for many literary, artistic, cinematic, and musical works that have reinterpreted it through the ages. "Faust" and the adjective "Faustian" imply sacrificing spiritual values for power, knowledge, or material gain.

The Faust of early books—as well as the ballads, dramas, movies, and puppet-plays which grew out of them—is irrevocably damned because he prefers human knowledge over divine knowledge: "he laid the Holy Scriptures behind the door and under the bench, refused to be called doctor of theology, but preferred to be styled doctor of medicine". Plays and comic puppet theatre loosely based on this legend were popular throughout Germany in the 16th century, often reducing Faust and Mephistopheles to figures of vulgar fun. The story was popularised in England by Christopher Marlowe, who gave it a classic treatment in his play The Tragical History of Doctor Faustus. In Goethe's reworking of the story over two hundred years later, Faust becomes a dissatisfied intellectual who yearns for "more than earthly meat and drink" in his life.

Summary of the story
Faust is unsatisfied with his life as a scholar and becomes depressed. After an attempt to take his own life, he calls on the Devil for further knowledge and magic powers with which to indulge all the pleasure and knowledge of the world. In response, the Devil's representative, Mephistopheles, appears. He makes a bargain with Faust: Mephistopheles will serve Faust with his magic powers for a set number of years, but at the end of the term, the Devil will claim Faust's soul, and Faust will be eternally enslaved.

During the term of the bargain, Faust makes use of Mephistopheles in various ways. In Goethe's drama, and many subsequent versions of the story, Mephistopheles helps Faust seduce a beautiful and innocent young woman, usually named Gretchen, whose life is ultimately destroyed when she gives birth to Faust's illegitimate son. Realizing this unholy act, she drowns the child and is held for murder. However, Gretchen's innocence saves her in the end, and she enters Heaven after execution. In Goethe's rendition, Faust is saved by God via his constant striving—in combination with Gretchen's pleadings with God in the form of the eternal feminine. However, in the early tales, Faust is irrevocably corrupted and believes his sins cannot be forgiven; when the term ends, the Devil carries him off to Hell.

Sources

The tale of Faust bears many similarities to the Theophilus legend recorded in the 13th century, writer Gautier de Coincy's Les Miracles de la Sainte Vierge. Here, a saintly figure makes a bargain with the keeper of the infernal world but is rescued from paying his debt to society through the mercy of the Blessed Virgin. A depiction of the scene in which he subordinates himself to the Devil appears on the north tympanum of the Cathedrale de Notre Dame de Paris.

The origin of Faust's name and persona remains unclear. In the Historia Brittonum, Faustus is the offspring of an incestuous marriage between king Vortigern and Vortigern's own daughter. 

The character is ostensibly based on Johann Georg Faust (c. 1480–1540), a magician and alchemist probably from Knittlingen, Württemberg, who obtained a degree in divinity from Heidelberg University in 1509, but the legendary Faust has also been connected with Johann Fust (c. 1400–1466), Johann Gutenberg's business partner, which suggests that Fust is one of the multiple origins to the Faust story.
Scholars such as Frank Baron and Leo Ruickbie contest many of these previous assumptions.

The character in Polish folklore named Pan Twardowski presents similarities with Faust. The Polish story seems to have originated at roughly the same time as its German counterpart, yet it is unclear whether the two tales have a common origin or influenced each other. The historical Johann Georg Faust had studied in Kraków for a time and may have served as the inspiration for the character in the Polish legend.

The first known printed source of the legend of Faust is a small chapbook bearing the title Historia von D. Johann Fausten, published in 1587. The book was re-edited and borrowed from throughout the 16th century. Other similar books of that period include:
 Das Wagnerbuch (1593)
 Das Widmann'sche Faustbuch (1599)
 Dr. Fausts großer und gewaltiger Höllenzwang (Frankfurt 1609)
 Dr. Johannes Faust, Magia naturalis et innaturalis (Passau 1612)
 Das Pfitzer'sche Faustbuch (1674)
 Dr. Fausts großer und gewaltiger Meergeist (Amsterdam 1692)
 Das Wagnerbuch (1714)
 Faustbuch des Christlich Meynenden (1725)

The 1725 Faust chapbook was widely circulated and also read by the young Goethe.

Related tales about a pact between man and the Devil include the plays Mariken van Nieumeghen (Dutch, early 16th century, author unknown), Cenodoxus (German, early 17th century, by Jacob Bidermann) and The Countess Cathleen (Irish legend of unknown origin believed by some to be taken from the French play Les marchands d'âmes).

Locations linked to the story
Staufen, a town in the extreme southwest of Germany, claims to be where Faust died; depictions appear on buildings, etc. The only historical source for this tradition is a passage in the Chronik der Grafen von Zimmern, which was written , 25 years after Faust's presumed death. These chronicles are generally considered reliable, and in the 16th century there were still family ties between the lords of Staufen and the counts of Zimmern in nearby Donaueschingen.

In Christopher Marlowe's original telling of the tale, Wittenburg—where Faust studied—was also written as Wertenberge. This has led to a measure of speculation as to precisely where his story is set. Some scholars suggest the Duchy of Württemberg; others suggest an allusion to Marlowe's own Cambridge (Gill, 2008, p. 5)

Literary adaptations

Marlowe's Doctor Faustus
The early Faust chapbook, while in circulation in northern Germany, found its way to England, where in 1592 an English translation was published, The Historie of the Damnable Life, and Deserved Death of Doctor Iohn Faustus credited to a certain "P. F., Gent[leman]". Christopher Marlowe used this work as the basis for his more ambitious play, The Tragical History of Doctor Faustus (published ). Marlowe also borrowed from John Foxe's Book of Martyrs, on the exchanges between Pope Adrian VI and a rival pope.

Goethe's Faust

Another important version of the legend is the play Faust, written by the German author Johann Wolfgang von Goethe. The first part, which is the one more closely connected to the earlier legend, was published in 1808, the second posthumously in 1832.

Goethe's Faust complicates the simple Christian moral of the original legend. A hybrid between a play and an extended poem, Goethe's two-part "closet drama" is epic in scope. It gathers together references from Christian, medieval, Roman, eastern, and Hellenic poetry, philosophy, and literature.

The composition and refinement of Goethe's own version of the legend occupied him, off and on, for over sixty years. The final version, published after his death, is recognized as a great work of German literature.

The story concerns the fate of Faust in his quest for the true essence of life (""). Frustrated with learning and the limits to his knowledge, power, and enjoyment of life, he attracts the attention of the Devil (represented by Mephistopheles), who makes a bet with Faust that he will be able to satisfy him. Faust is reluctant, believing this will never happen. This is a significant difference between Goethe's "Faust" and Marlowe's; Faust is not the one who suggests the wager.

In the first part, Mephistopheles leads Faust through experiences that culminate in a lustful relationship with Gretchen, an innocent young woman. Gretchen and her family are destroyed by Mephistopheles' deceptions and Faust's desires. Part one of the story ends in tragedy for Faust, as Gretchen is saved but Faust is left to grieve in shame.

The second part begins with the spirits of the earth forgiving Faust (and the rest of mankind) and progresses into allegorical poetry. Faust and his Devil pass through and manipulate the world of politics and the world of the classical gods, and meet with Helen of Troy (the personification of beauty). Finally, in anticipation of having tamed the forces of war and nature and created a place for a free people to live, Faust is happy and dies.

Mephistopheles tries to seize Faust's soul when he dies after this moment of happiness, but is frustrated and enraged when angels intervene due to God's grace. Though this grace is 'gratuitous' and does not condone Faust's frequent errors with Mephistopheles, the angels state that this grace can only occur because of Faust's unending striving and due to the intercession of the forgiving Gretchen. The final scene has Faust's soul carried to Heaven in the presence of God by the intercession of the "Virgin, Mother, Queen, ... Goddess kind forever... Eternal Womanhood. The woman is thus victorious over Mephistopheles, who had insisted at Faust's death that he would be consigned to "The Eternal Empty".

Mann's Doctor Faustus
Thomas Mann's 1947  adapts the Faust legend to a 20th-century context, documenting the life of fictional composer Adrian Leverkühn as analog and embodiment of the early 20th-century history of Germany and of Europe. The talented Leverkühn, after contracting venereal disease from a brothel visit, forms a pact with a Mephistophelean character to grant him 24 years of brilliance and success as a composer. He produces works of increasing beauty to universal acclaim, even while physical illness begins to corrupt his body. In 1930, when presenting his final masterwork (The Lamentation of Dr Faust), he confesses the pact he had made: madness and syphilis now overcome him, and he suffers a slow and total collapse until his death in 1940. Leverkühn's spiritual, mental, and physical collapse and degradation are mapped on to the period in which Nazism rose in Germany, and Leverkühn's fate is shown as that of the soul of Germany.

Benét's The Devil and Daniel Webster

Stephen Vincent Benét's short story "The Devil and Daniel Webster" published in 1937 is a retelling of the tale of Faust based on the short story "The Devil and Tom Walker", written by Washington Irving. Benet's version of the story centers on a New Hampshire farmer by the name of Jabez Stone who, plagued with unending bad luck, is approached by the devil under the name of Mr. Scratch who offers him seven years of prosperity in exchange for his soul. Jabez Stone is eventually defended by Daniel Webster, a fictional version of the famous lawyer and orator, in front of a judge and jury of the damned, and his case is won. It was adapted in 1941 as a movie,  The Devil and Daniel Webster, with Walter Huston as the devil, James Craig as Jabez and Edward Arnold as Webster. It was remade in 2007 as Shortcut to Happiness with Alec Baldwin as Jabez, Anthony Hopkins as Webster and Jennifer Love Hewitt as the Devil.

Selected additional dramatic works 
 Faust (1836) by Nikolaus Lenau
 Faust (1839) Ludwig Hermann Wolfram 
 Doctor Faust. Dance Poem (1851) by Heinrich Heine
 Faust: The Third Part of the Tragedy (1862) by Friedrich Theodor Vischer
 The Death of Doctor Faustus (1925) by Michel de Ghelderode
 Mephisto (1933) Klaus Mann
 Faust, a Subjective Tragedy (1934) by Fernando Pessoa
 Doctor Faustus Lights the Lights (1938) by Gertrude Stein
 My Faust (1940) by Paul Valéry
 Faust '67 (1969) by Tommaso Landolfi
 Doctor Faustus (1979) by Don Nigro
 Temptation (1985) by Václav Havel (Translated by Marie Winn)
 Faustus (2004) by David Mamet
 Wittenberg (2008) by David Davalos
 Faust (2009) by Edgar Brau
 Faust 3 (2016) by Peter Schumann, Bread and Puppet Theater
 Il Dottor Faust (2018) by Menotti Lerro

Selected additional novels, stories, poems, and comics
 The Devil and Tom Walker (1824) by Washington Irving
 Faust (1855) novella by Ivan Turgenev
 The Cobbler and the Devil (1863) by August Šenoa
 Fausto (1866) by Estanislao del Campo
 The Year the Yankees Lost the Pennant (1954) by Douglass Wallop adapts the Faust theme to baseball
 The Recognitions (1955) by William Gaddis
 The Master and Margarita (1967) by Mikhail Bulgakov
 The Picture of Dorian Gray (1891) by Oscar Wilde
 Faust (manga) (1950) adaptation by Osamu Tezuka
 Faust (1980) by Robert Nye 
 Mefisto (1986) by John Banville
 Faust (comics) (1987–2012) series of comic books by David Quinn & Tim Vigil
 Eric (1990) by Terry Pratchett
 Jack Faust (1997) by Michael Swanwick
 Waves (2009) novel by Ogan Gurel
 "Both Sides Now" (2013) science fiction novella adaptation by Thomas Wm. Hamilton
 Frau Faust (2014–Present) by Kore Yamazaki 
 Soul Cartel (2014–2017) by Haram and Youngji Kim
 Teeth in the Mist (2019) by Dawn Kurtagich
 This Ruler (2019) novel by Mark Duff (Character: Dr. Stufa; an anagram of Faust)
 Faz & Mef And Some Christmas-Card Stories (2020) short story by John Thomas (Faust as a young chemistry student, out to feed the world)
 The Master's Apprentice (2020) by Oliver Pötzsch
 The Devil's Pawn (2021) by Oliver Pötzsch

Cinematic adaptations

Early films
 Faust and Marguerite, a short copyrighted by Edison Manufacturing Co. in 1900
 Faust, an obscure (now lost) 1921 American silent film directed by Frederick A. Todd
 Faust, a 14-minute-long 1922 British silent film directed by Challis Sanderson
 Faust, a 1922 French silent film directed by Gérard Bourgeois, regarded as the first ever 3-D film

Murnau's Faust
F.W. Murnau, director of the classic Nosferatu, directed a silent version of Faust that premiered in 1926. Murnau's film featured special effects that were remarkable for the era. In one scene, Mephisto towers over a town, dark wings spread wide, as a fog rolls in bringing the plague. In another, an extended montage sequence shows Faust, mounted behind Mephisto, riding through the heavens, and the camera view, effectively swooping through quickly changing panoramic backgrounds, courses past snowy mountains, high promontories and cliffs, and waterfalls.

In the Murnau version of the tale, the aging bearded scholar and alchemist is disillusioned by the palpable failure of his supposed cure for a plague that has stricken his town. Faust renounces his many years of hard travail and studies in alchemy. In his despair, he hauls all his bound volumes by armloads onto a growing pyre, intending to burn them. However, a wind turns over a few cabalistic leaves, and one of the books' pages catches Faust's eye. Their words contain a prescription for how to invoke the dreadful dark forces.

Faust heeds these recipes and begins enacting the mystic protocols: on a hill, alone, summoning Mephisto, certain forces begin to convene, and Faust in a state of growing trepidation hesitates, and begins to withdraw; he flees along a winding, twisting pathway, returning to his study chambers. At pauses along this retreat, though, he meets a reappearing figure. Each time, it doffs its hat—in a greeting, that is Mephisto, confronting him. Mephisto overcomes Faust's reluctance to sign a long binding pact with the invitation that Faust may try on these powers, just for one day, and without obligation to longer terms. Upon the end of that day, the sands of twenty-four hours having run out, after Faust's having been restored to youth and, helped by his servant Mephisto to steal a beautiful woman from her wedding feast, Faust is tempted so much that he agrees to sign a pact for eternity (which is to say when, in due course, his time runs out). Eventually Faust becomes bored with the pursuit of pleasure and returns home, where he falls in love with the beautiful and innocent Gretchen. His corruption (enabled, or embodied, through the forms of Mephisto) ultimately ruins both their lives, though there is still a chance for redemption in the end.

Similarities to Goethe's Faust include the classic tale of a man who sold his soul to the Devil, the same Mephisto wagering with an angel to corrupt the soul of Faust, the plague sent by Mephisto on Faust's small town, and the familiar cliffhanger with Faust unable to find a cure for the Plague, and therefore turning to Mephisto, renouncing God, the angel, and science alike.

La Beauté du diable (The Beauty of the Devil)
Directed by René Clair, 1950, La Beauté du diable is an adaptation with Michel Simon as Mephistopheles/Faust as old man, and Gérard Philipe as Faust transformed into a young man.

Phantom of the Paradise
Directed by Brian DePalma, 1974 - A vain rock impresario, who has sold his soul to the Devil in exchange for eternal youth, corrupts and destroys a brilliant but unsuccessful songwriter and a beautiful ingenue.

Mephisto (1981)
Mephisto (1981), directed by István Szabó, portrays an actor in 1930s Germany who aligns himself with the Nazi party for prestige.

Lekce Faust (Faust)
Directed by Jan Švankmajer, 1994 – The source material of Švankmajer's film is the Faust legend; including traditional Czech puppet show versions, this film production uses a variety of cinematic formats, such as stop-motion photography animation and claymation.

Faust
Directed by Aleksandr Sokurov, 2011 – German-language film starring Johannes Zeiler, Anton Adasinsky, Isolda Dychauk.

American Satan
Directed by Ash Avildsen, 2017 – A rock and roll modern retelling of the Faust legend starring Andy Biersack as Johnny Faust.

The Last Faust
Directed by Philipp Humm, 2019 – a contemporary feature art film directly based on Goethe's Faust, Part One and Faust, Part Two. The film is the first filmed version of Faust, I and Faust, II as well as a part of Humm's Gesamtkunstwerk, an art project with over 150 different artworks such as paintings, photos, sculptures, drawings and an illustrated novella.

Musical adaptations

Operatic
The Faust legend has been the basis for several major operas: for a more complete list, visit Works based on Faust
 Mefistofele, the only completed opera by Arrigo Boito
 Doktor Faust, begun by Ferruccio Busoni and completed by his pupil Philipp Jarnach
 Faust, by Charles Gounod to a French libretto by Jules Barbier and Michel Carré from Carré's play Faust et Marguerite, in turn loosely based on Goethe's Faust, Part 1
 Faust (Spohr), one of the earliest operatic adaptations of the story, with separate versions premiering in 1816 and 1852 respectively
 Hector Berlioz's La Damnation de Faust (1846)
 Alfred Schnittke's Historia von D. Johann Fausten, composed between 1983-1994, and premiered in 1995
 Rudolf Volz's Rock Opera Faust with original lyrics by Goethe (1997)

Symphonic
Faust has inspired major musical works in other forms: 
 Faust Overture by Richard Wagner
 Scenes from Goethe's Faust by Robert Schumann
 Faust Symphony by Franz Liszt
 Symphony No. 8 by Gustav Mahler
 Histoire du soldat by Igor Stravinsky

Other adaptations
 Faust was the title and inspiration of Phantom Regiment Drum and Bugle Corps' 2006 show
 Faustian Echoes by American black metal band Agalloch.
 "Faust Arp" by English rock band Radiohead. From the album In Rainbows.
 "The Small Print" by English rock band Muse. From the album Absolution. Originally titled "Action Faust", it is an interpretation of the tale from the Devil's perspective.
 "Bohemian Rhapsody" by English rock band Queen. From the album A Night at the Opera.
 "Faust" by singer songwriter Paul Williams from the original soundtrack of The Phantom of the Paradise.
 "Faust" by English virtual band Gorillaz. From the album G-Sides.
 "Absinthe with Faust" by English extreme metal band Cradle of Filth. From the album Nymphetamine.
 "Urfaust", "The Calling", "The Oath", "Conjuring the Cull", and "The Harrowing" by American death metal band Misery Index. The first five tracks from the album The Killing Gods. A five-song, modern interpretation of Goethe's Faust.
 Epica and The Black Halo by international power metal band Kamelot. A two-album interpretation of the tale.
 "Faust" by American metalcore band The Human Abstract. From the album Digital Veil.
 "Faust" by horrorcore rapper SickTanicK feat. Texas Microphone Massacre. From the album Chapter 3: Awake (The Ministry of Hate).
 "Faust, Midas and Myself" by American alternative rock band Switchfoot. From the album Oh! Gravity.
 "The Faustian Alchemist" by Finnish black metal band Belzebubs. From the album Pantheon of the Nightside Gods.
 Randy Newman's Faust. A rock opera written and co-produced by Randy Newman with: Don Henley as Faust; Randy Newman as the devil; James Taylor as the Lord; Bonnie Raitt as Martha; and Linda Ronstadt as Margaret.
 Damn Yankees is a 1954 musical adaptation of the novel The Year the Yankees Lost the Pennant, which set the Faust theme in the world of mid-20th century American baseball.
 Crossroads, starring Ralph Macchio as the Daniel Webster-like savior of an elderly Blues harpist.
 Faust, a character from the video game franchise Guilty Gear.
Bård Guldvik "Faust" Eithun, Norwegian drummer and convicted murderer known primarily for his work for black metal band Emperor.

In psychotherapy
Psychodynamic therapy uses the idea of a Faustian bargain to explain defence mechanisms, usually rooted in childhood, that sacrifice elements of the self in favor of some form of psychological survival. For the neurotic, abandoning one's genuine feeling self in favour of a false self more amenable to caretakers may offer a viable form of life, but at the expense of one's true emotions and affects. For the psychotic, a Faustian bargain with an omnipotent self can offer the imaginary refuge of a psychic retreat at the price of living in unreality.

See also
Shinigami, an Edo period, rakugo work with a similar premise
 Jonathan Moulton, also known as the "Yankee Faust"
 Robert Johnson
 Puella Magi Madoka Magica, an anime franchise significantly inspired by Faust
 The Little Mermaid, the fairytale by Hans Christian Andersen, that has a similar plot and themes, and is often considered a child friendly retelling.

Notes

Sources
 Doctor Faustus by Christopher Marlowe, edited and with an introduction by Sylvan Barnet. Signet Classics, 1969.
 J. Scheible, Das Kloster (1840s).

Further reading
 The Faustian Century: German Literature and Culture in the Age of Luther and Faustus. Ed. J. M. van der Laan and Andrew Weeks. Camden House, 2013. 
 A philosophical interpretation: Seung, T.K. Cultural Thematics: The Formation of the Faustian Ethos. Yale University Press. 1976.

External links
 Faust, BBC Radio 4 discussion with Juliette Wood, Osman Durrani & Rosemary Ashton (In Our Time, Dec. 23, 2004)

 
Fictional characters introduced in the 16th century
Characters in Goethe's Faust
Fictional characters who have made pacts with devils
Legendary German people